Bodo von Borries (born 22 May 1905 in Herford, North Rhine-Westphalia, Germany — died 17 July 1956 in Aachen, North Rhine-Westphalia) was a German physicist. He was the co-inventor of the electron microscope.

Von Borries studied  electrical engineering at the Technical University of Danzig, and at Berlin Institute of Technology, where he was awarded a PhD in 1932. 
Von Borries worked at RWE from 1934 to 1937. In 1937 he commenced work on electron microscopy with Ernst Ruska at Siemens & Halske AG in Berlin. In 1937 von Borries 1937 married Hedwig Ruska, Ernst Ruska's sister.

After World War II , he founded the "Rhine-Westphalia Institute for Electron Microscopy" in Düsseldorf in 1948. In 1949, he was involved in the foundation of the German Society for Electron Microscopy.

In 1953 he became a full professor at the Technical University of Aachen and established its Department of Electron Optics and Precision Engineering, where he worked until his sudden death in 1956.

References

20th-century German physicists
1905 births
1956 deaths
Gdańsk University of Technology alumni
People from Herford
People from the Province of Westphalia
Presidents of the International Federation of Societies for Microscopy
Technical University of Berlin alumni
Academic staff of RWTH Aachen University